Another World Entertainment (also known as simply AWE) is a Danish home video distribution company and sports platform.

Another World Entertainment was established in January 2006 and has been a leading distributor of a number of titles on DVD and more recently, Blu-ray Disc. Horror films are the company's most released genre, having released several cannibal, zombie and vampire films. However, other genres do include drama, comedy, sci-fi, thriller, action and western.

Releases

DVD

Stuck (DVD title: #Stuck, released June 2015)
13 Assassins (released November 2012)
186 Dollars to Freedom (released March 2013)
187 (released March 2013)
2 Days in Paris (DVD title: 2 Dage i Paris, released February 2012)
2019, After the Fall of New York (released April 2011)
'71 (DVD title: Bag fjendens linjer, released April 2015)
99 Women (released November 2009)
A Bittersweet Life (released November 2009)
A Christmas Carol
A Film with Me in It (released August 2011)
A Gang Story (released March 2013)
A Girl Walks Home Alone at Night (released November 2015)
A Horrible Way to Die (released January 2012)
A Merry War (released April 2012)
A Night in Old Mexico (released December 2014)
A Reason to Live, a Reason to Die (released March 2008)
A Thousand Times Good Night (released September 2014)
ABCs of Death 2 (released February 2015)
Address Unknown (released February 2008)
Adult World (released May 2015)
Aftenlandet (released September 2011)
Alice in Wonderland (1999, released April 2012)
Alien vs. Ninja (released April 2011)
Alien vs. Zombies: The Dark Lurking (released November 2010)
All My Friends Are Leaving Brisbane (released October 2012)
Almanya: Welcome to Germany (DVD title: Almanya: Velkommen til Tyskland, released August 2012)
Alyce (released January 2013)
American Swing (released April 2010)
Amityville 3-D (DVD title: Amityville: Huset som gud glemte 3D, released June 2012)
Among the Living (released October 2014)
Anita: Swedish Nymphet (DVD title: Anita: En ung nymfomans dagbog, released June 2010)
Ann & Eve (released February 2008)
Antiviral (released September 2013)
Ascension (2-disc set, released July 2008)
Ashes and Diamonds (DVD title: Aske og diamanter, released November 2011)
Assassin (released May 2015)
Assault on Precinct 13 (released February 2012)
Axed (released July 2012)
Baby Love (1974, released April 2009)
Bad Biology (released October 2010)
Bad Boy Bubby (released September 2010)
Bag Blixens maske (released December 2011)
Bandaged (released March 2011)
Barabbas (released April 2014)
Baskin (released May 2016)
Becket (released October 2009)
Before Midnight (released January 2014)
Bel Ami (1976, released September 2009)
The Belly of an Architect (DVD title: Arkitektens mave, released October 2012)
Beneath the Darkness (released October 2014)
Beyond the Limits (released June 2012)
Bikini Girls on Ice (released February 2011)
Birdcage Inn (released February 2008)
Birth of the Living Dead, inc. Night of the Living Dead (released September 2014) 
Bitter Feast (released March 2012)
Black Magic Rites (released February 2009)
Black Past (released August 2011)
Black Venus (released October 2010)
The Duchess and the Dirtwater Fox (DVD title: Amanda og rævepelsen, released February 2013)
Feng kuang da ben zei (DVD title: Bikinibanden, released June 2009)
Hibernatus (DVD title: Bedstefar på glatis, released February 2008)
Jamesy Boy (DVD title: Bag Murene, released My 2015)
The Key (DVD title: Bag Låste Døre, released June 2007)
Life's a Beach (DVD title: Bikini Beach, released January 2013)
Le tatoué (DVD title: Av - min ryg!, released June 2013)
Mancation (DVD title: American Hangover, released June 2013)
Perfect Prey (DVD title: American Murder, released June 2012)
Tarzoon: Shame of the Jungle (released October 2011)
Three Monkeys (released March 2012)

Blu-ray

13 Assassins (released November 2012)
186 Dollars to Freedom (released March 2013)
A Film with Me in It (released August 2011)
A Gang Story (released March 2013)
The ABCs of Death (released June 2013)
Alien vs. Ninja (released April 2011)
Among the Living (released October 2014)
Antiviral (released September 2013)
Assault on Precinct 13 (released February 2012)
Bad Biology (released October 2010)
Bad Boy Bubby (released September 2010)
Beasts of the Southern Wild (Blu-ray title: Hush Puppy – released May 2013)
Before Midnight (released January 2014)
Boy Wonder (released November 2012)
Boys of Abu Ghraib (released February 2015)
Bringing Up Bobby (released October 2012)
The Broken Circle Breakdown (released March 2014)
Caged (released August 2011)
Cannibal Holocaust (Uncut – released October 2015)
Cannibal Holocaust (Uncut Limited Edition – released October 2015)
Citizen Gangster (released August 2012)
Close Range (released November 2015)
Colt 45 (2014 – released January 2015)
The Connection (Blu-ray title: Den franske forbindelse – released January 2016)
The Corpse of Anna Fritz (released January 2016)
De guerre lasse (Blu-ray title: Marseille – September 2014)
The Dead Lands (released July 2015) 
Dead Rising: Watchtower (released August 2015)
Dear Mr. Gacy (released September 2011)
Deathgasm (released March 2016)
The Devil's Hand (released April 2015)
Devil's Playground (released June 2011)
Endgame (released May 2011)
Enemies Closer (released April 2014)
Enter the Void (released September 2011)
Excision (released April 2013)
Fruitvale Station (released May 2014)
The Good, the Bad, the Weird (released September 2010)
The Green Inferno (released April 2016)
Halo 4: Forward Unto Dawn (released September 2014)
Halo: Nightfall (released March 2015)
Halo: The Fall of Reach (released December 2015)
Hellions (released October 2015)
Hick (released October 2014)
The House of the Devil (released November 2010)
Inbred (released February 2013)
The Incident (released January 2013) 
Ingrid Bergman: In Her Own Words (Blu-ray title: Jeg er Ingrid – released February 2016)
The Innkeepers (released May 2012)
Inside the Whore (released October 2012)
John Dies at the End (released November 2013)
La Cueva (Blu-ray title: In Darkness We Fall – released November 2014)
Labor Pains (Blu-ray title: Store forventninger – released October 2011)
Late Phases (released April 2015)
The Liability (released September 2013)
Like Dandelion Dust (Blu-ray title: Som støv fra himmelen – released August 2011)
Little Ashes (released November 2011)
Livid (released November 2012)
Lore (released August 2013)  
Jamesy Boy (Blu-ray title: Bad Murene – released May 2015)
Kokoda (Blu-ray title: Pacific War Hell – released December 2011)
Maniac (2012 – released October 2013)
Martyrs (2016 – released May 2016)
Michael Kohlhaas (released February 2014)
Mommy (released August 2015)
The Music Never Stopped (released May 2012)
Neds (released April 2012)
Night of the Living Dead 3D: Re-Animation (released June 2012)
Open Windows (released November 2014)
The Outsider (released June 2014)
Paris by Night (released May 2013)
Rabid Dogs (released March 2016)
REC 3: Génesis (released March 2013)
REC 4: Apocalypse (released March 2015)
Redeemer (released September 2015)
Reykjavik Whale Watching Massacre (released April 2011)
Screwed (2011 – released October 2012)
Skills (released April 2011)
Sleepless Night (released August 2013)
Spring (released November 2015)
Spud (Blu-ray title: Spud Milton: med ørerne i maskinen – released June 2012)
Switch (released July 2012)
Telstar: The Joe Meek Story (Blu-ray title: Telstar – released June 2011)
The Texas Chain Saw Massacre (40th Anniversary 2-Disc Special Edition – released November 2014)
These Final Hours (released March 2015)
Through the Air (Blu-ray title: Snigskytten – released February 2016)
Ticker (Blu-ray title: San Francisco Kill Squad – released December 2011)
Torment (released October 2014)
Tracks (released December 2014)
Trade of Innocents (released February 2013)
Vendetta (released March 2014)
War Pigs (released October 2015)
Welcome to New York (released February 2015)
What We Do in the Shadows (released January 2015) 
Wog Boy 2: Kings of Mykonos (Blu-ray title: Min storefede græske arv – released November 2011)
You May Not Kiss the Bride (Blu-ray title: Nu går den vilde bryllupsrejse – released September 2012)
Zero Tolerance (released September 2015)

External links
 Official site

Home video distributors
DVD companies
Mass media companies established in 2006
Entertainment companies of Denmark
2006 establishments in Denmark